is a greatest hits album by Japanese singer Mie. Released through Sony Music House on June 19, 2002 to coincide with the 20th anniversary of Mie's solo career, the album compiles her solo works from her Victor Entertainment, CBS Sony, and Funhouse eras and includes the Japanese version of Geri Halliwell's cover of The Weather Girls song "It's Raining Men", from the 2001 film Bridget Jones's Diary.

Track listing

References

External links
 
 
 

2002 compilation albums
Mie albums
Japanese-language compilation albums
Sony Music Entertainment Japan compilation albums